Škalske Cirkovce is a settlement in the Municipality of Velenje in northern Slovenia. It lies in the hills north of Velenje. The area is part of the traditional region of Styria. The entire municipality is now included in the Savinja Statistical Region.

The local church is dedicated to Saint Oswald and belongs to the Parish of Velenje Saint Martin. Parts of the original Romanesque building are preserved in the northern wall of the nave. The sanctuary is Gothic and the remainder of the church dates to a major rebuilding in the late 18th century.

References

External links
Škalske Cirkovce at Geopedia

Populated places in the City Municipality of Velenje